Events in the year 1843 in Brazil.

Incumbents
 Monarch – Pedro II

Events
Brazil starts to produce national postage stamps

Births
 26 May - Artur Silveira da Mota

Deaths

References

 
Years of the 19th century in Brazil
Brazil
Brazil